"Scared" is a song by Canadian rock band The Tragically Hip. It was released in September 1995 as the fifth single from the band's 1994 album, Day for Night. The song peaked at number 57 on the Canadian RPM Singles chart. The song was featured in the 2006 film, Trailer Park Boys: The Movie, and was included on the film's soundtrack.

Charts

References

1995 singles
The Tragically Hip songs